The Harrison County Courthouse in Cynthiana, Kentucky is a Greek Revival-style courthouse building built in 1851.  It was listed on the National Register of Historic Places in 1974.

Located at 100 Main Street, it was built and was perhaps designed by John Huddleston.

It is a contributing building in the 1982 NRHP-listed Cynthiana Commercial District.

References

County courthouses in Kentucky
National Register of Historic Places in Harrison County, Kentucky
Greek Revival architecture in Kentucky
Government buildings completed in 1851
1851 establishments in Kentucky
Courthouses on the National Register of Historic Places in Kentucky
Individually listed contributing properties to historic districts on the National Register in Kentucky
Cynthiana, Kentucky